SM City Tianjin is a shopping mall in Tianjin, China under the Philippine mall chain SM Supermalls.

History
Philippine retail conglomerate SM Group founded by Henry Sy planned to expand its shopping mall business in China. SM's first mall in China, SM City Xiamen opened in Fujian in 2001. Its strategy at that time is to open malls in "second-tier" cities such as Suzhou, Chongqing, Zibo, and Tianjin rather than Beijing and Shanghai where it deems to already have a very competitive shopping mall sector and have high property prices. The groundbreaking ceremony for SM City Tianjin was held on November 26, 2010.

SM City Tianjin opened at the Tianjin Airport Economic Area in December 17, 2016. It is the seventh mall of the Philippine mall chain SM Supermalls in China. The mall complex was designed by architecture firm ARQ.

References

Buildings and structures in Tianjin
Shopping malls established in 2016
Tianjin
Tourist attractions in Tianjin